Kohandan (also romanized as Kohandān) is a village in Qahan Rural District, Khalajastan District, Qom County, Qom Province, Iran. At the 2006 census, its population was 429, in 138 families.

References 

Populated places in Qom Province